Goat is a 2015 Slovak drama film directed by Ivan Ostrochovský. It was screened in the Contemporary World Cinema section of the 2015 Toronto International Film Festival. The film was selected as the Slovak entry for the Best Foreign Language Film at the 88th Academy Awards but it was not nominated.

Cast
 Peter Baláž as himself
 Nikola Bongilajová as Nikolka
 Stanislava Bongilajová as Misa
 Ján Franek as Franek
 Alexandra Palatinusová as Mia (voice)
 Tatiana Piussi as HItchhiker
 Manfred Schmid as The German

See also
 List of submissions to the 88th Academy Awards for Best Foreign Language Film
 List of Slovak submissions for the Academy Award for Best Foreign Language Film

References

External links
 

2015 films
2015 drama films
Slovak-language films
2015 directorial debut films
Films about abortion
Sun in a Net Awards winners (films)
Slovak drama films